The Ocean Viking is a humanitarian ship chartered from July 2019 by the SOS Méditerranée  association.

The vessel
On 21 July 2019 SOS Méditerranée announced a new rescue campaign off the Libyan coast, using a cargo ship, the Ocean Viking. The approach is supported by the Norwegian authorities, who have given the vessel a flag. The operation costs € 14,000 per day. The vessel, which is 69 m long by 15 m beam, was built in 1986 to serve as a support vessel for oil rigs in the North Sea. It is operated by around thirty people (nine crew members, a search and rescue team and medical personnel) and can carry up to 200 passengers. It is faster and better equipped than the Aquarius. Onboard microphones and cameras will make it possible to record everything that happens on board and around the boat, in order to possibly prove that the work was carried out within a legal framework The ship, which will respect the ban on disembarking migrants in Italian ports is even banned from refueling in Malta.

Selected list of interventions
During its first outing, four rescue missions on 9, 10 and 11 August 2019, brought the number of refugees on board to 356, to which were added a further 160 from on board the ship Open Arms. 

 

By 29 January 2020, when 407 migrants (recovered after five night rescue operations in less than 72 hours off Libya) disembarked in Taranto, the number of people saved thanks to the operations of this ship had mounted to more than 1,600. 

The ship was impounded for five months from July 2020, during which time additional equipment had been added, and released on 21 December 2020. Ocean Viking resumed operations in January 2021, embarking journalists from Mediapart. The crew rescued 119 migrants off the Libyan coast on 21 January 2021; two more rescues the next day brought the number of migrants on board to 374. They disembarked on 25 January at Augusta in Sicily.

At the end of March 2021, the Ocean Viking was stranded to the south of Malta, pending permission to disembark 116 migrants rescued the previous week. The crew of the ship then tried to rescue further migrants during the sinking of 22 April 2021 in the Mediterranean, but without success.

External links 
SOS MEDITERRANEE ITALIA

References 

Sea rescue organizations
European migrant crisis
Immigrant rights activism
Humanitarian aid organizations in Europe
Refugee aid organizations in Europe